Patrick Bunk-Andersen (born 13 January 1995) is a Danish footballer who plays as a defender.

Career

Youth, College and Amateur
Bunk-Anderson played for club Hvidovre IF in his home country of Denmark.  After finishing secondary school in Denmark, Bunk-Anderson used a program that matches Scandinavian athletes with US Colleges to find Clemson University.  Bunk-Anderson would go on to make 82 appearances for the Tigers and score 4 goals in his four years at Clemson.  In 2015, his freshman year, he was named to TopDrawerSoccer's all Freshman Team.  He was named captain of the squad in 2018.

Professional
Bunk-Anderson was drafted in the third round, 64th overall, of the 2019 MLS SuperDraft by Toronto FC.  He was signed by Toronto FC II on March 13, 2019. Bunk-Anderson made his debut for the club on April 5, 2019 when he started as a defender in a game against Orlando City B.

Bunk-Anderson scored his first career professional goal on May 12, 2019 in a game against Tormenta FC.

References

External links
 
 
 Profile at Clemson Athletics

1995 births
Living people
Danish men's footballers
Danish expatriate men's footballers
Association football defenders
Clemson Tigers men's soccer players
Expatriate soccer players in the United States
Hillerød Fodbold players
Hvidovre IF players
Pittsburgh Riverhounds SC players
Skovshoved IF players
Toronto FC draft picks
Toronto FC II players
USL League One players
Footballers from Copenhagen